Electric Sheep is a volunteer computing project for animating and evolving fractal flames, which are in turn distributed to the networked computers, which display them as a screensaver.

Process
The process is transparent to the casual user, who can simply install the software as a screensaver.  Alternatively, the user may become more involved with the project, manually creating a fractal flame file for upload to the server where it is rendered into a video file of the animated fractal flame.  As the screensaver entertains the user, their computer is also used for rendering commercial projects, sales of which keep the servers and developers running.

There are about 500,000 active users (monthly uniques).

According to Mitchell Whitelaw in his Metacreation: Art and Artificial Life, "On the screen they are luminous, twisting, elastic shapes, abstract tangles and loops of glowing filaments."

The name "Electric Sheep" is taken from the title of Philip K. Dick's novel Do Androids Dream of Electric Sheep?.  The title mirrors the nature of the project: computers (androids) who have started running the screensaver begin rendering (dreaming) the fractal movies (sheep).

The sheep motif is carried over into other aspects of the project: the 100 or so sheep stored on the server at any time is referred to as 'the flock'; creating a new fractal by interpolating or combining the sheep's fractal code with that of another sheep is called mating/breeding; changes to the code are called mutations, etc.

The parameters that generate these movies (sheep) can be created in a few ways: they can be created and submitted by members of the electricsheep mailing list, members of the mailing list can download the parameters of existing sheep and tweak them, or sheep can be mated together automatically by the server or manually by server admins (nicknamed shepherds).

Users may vote on sheep that they like or dislike, and this voting is used for the genetic algorithm which generates new sheep. Each movie is a fractal flame with several of its parameters animated. The individual frames of which these movies consist are rendered using 'spare' processing cycles from idle computers on the distributed network of those running the screensaver application, and finished sheep (in the form of .avi files) are distributed to the network.

The computer-generated sheep parameters and movies are distributed under the Creative Commons Attribution Noncommercial (CC-BY-NC) license; user-generated sheep parameters are under the Creative Commons Attribution (CC-BY) license. Both are automatically downloaded by the screen saver. The underlying copyright issues raised by generative, distributed digital art projects involve novel legal issues that the current copyright system can not understand or handle.

The screensaver was created and released as free software by Scott Draves in 1999 and continues to be developed by him and a team of about five engineers.

The 2.7.x series differs from the old versions. It has a new logo, higher quality sheep and other features. It has switched to a freemium model in which the server software is not available and much of the computed data is not available under a free license, which led to its removal from Debian.

See also

 Evolutionary art
 List of volunteer computing projects
 Software art

Notes

References

 —Technical paper about the project.

External links

 
 

Computer art
Volunteer computing projects
Screensavers
Fractal software
Software using the GPL license